Crosita is a leaf beetle genus in the sub family Chrysomelinae.

Species

References

External links

Chrysomelinae
Taxa named by Victor Motschulsky
Chrysomelidae genera